Mexican jazz is the given name for the jazz created by Mexicans or in Mexico since the 1920s, although there were isolated cases even in the genesis of the jazz genre itself.

Mexican big bands
Mexico is linked to the big band format. The main reason has to do with the settlement of the famous Cuban Dámaso Pérez Prado, who lived in Mexico from 1949 until his death in 1989.

The Mexican actor, orchestra director, and singer Luis Arcaraz was called Mexico's Jazz King by RKO-Pathé. In 1955, Down Beat magazine positioned Arcaraz's band as number four around the world.

Mexican jazz bars
Before the rise of a new wave of jazz festivals in Mexico, the main venues for jazz were bars, restaurants and nightclubs. Some of the venues are:
 Bar Nueva Orleans
 El Convite
 Parker & Lenox
 Jazzorca
 Las musas de Papá Sibarita

Mexican jazz boom
Due to the impact of globalization, around 2010, Mexican jazz began to flourish as never before. There are many reasons for this boom including:
 Internet popularisation
 The end of the supremacy of music companies
 A strong overall design of national tours done by jazz players and jazz managers
 Mexican jazz players performing outside the country on a regular basis
 The saturation of massive genres
 Social media as a showcase
 The birth of websites specialised in Mexican jazz that encourages jazz journalism
 The opening of bachelor degrees specialising in jazz, and the emergence of schools teaching popular music
 The supply of Mexican jazz TV series on open television
 The media conquest carry out by jazz players, jazz managers, and critics
 New wave of jazz festivals around the country
 The opening of more jazz clubs and the possibility to play this genre in different bars

Mexican jazz in the media

Almost all the 20th century Mexican Jazz was poorly represented in the media with the exception of the radio. But since 2012 it has been gaining ground.

 
Latin jazz